Belgrade (Walloon: Belgråde) is an ancient village of Wallonia and a district of the city of Namur, located in the province of Namur, Belgium. It was named after Belgrade, Serbia in 1718 to commemorate the Austrian Empire's conquest of the city from the Ottoman Turks (the county of Namur was a dependency of the Austria-ruling royal house of Habsburg).

References

External links
 

Sub-municipalities of Namur (city)
Former municipalities of Namur (province)